Paradise Hills may refer to:

 Paradise Hills (film), a 2019 Spanish science fantasy thriller film
 Paradise Hills, San Diego, California, United States, an urban neighborhood
 Paradise Hills, New Mexico, United States, a census-designated place

See also
 Paradise Hill (disambiguation)